Breard v. Greene, 523 U.S. 371 (1998), is a United States Supreme Court decision decided on April 14, 1998 which placed the United States directly in conflict with the International Court of Justice and has since been used as precedent.

Background

In 1992, Ángel Francisco Breard, a citizen of Paraguay, was convicted of the rape and capital murder of Ruth Dickie. Breard was scheduled to be executed by the Commonwealth of Virginia in 1996. Ultimately, Breard filed a motion for habeas relief in Federal District Court, alleging that arresting authorities violated the Vienna Convention on Consular Relations when they failed to inform him that, as a foreign national, he had the right to contact the Paraguayan Consulate. The court concluded that Breard had procedurally defaulted on this claim by failing to raise it in state court. The Court of Appeals affirmed. In 1996, Paraguayan officials brought suit alleging that Virginia officials had violated their rights under the Vienna Convention by failing to inform Breard of his treaty rights and the Paraguayan consulate of Breard's situation. Ultimately, the District Court concluded that it lacked jurisdiction. The Court of Appeals affirmed.

The U.S. Supreme Court ruled Breard would not receive a stay of execution and/or other relief under the Vienna Convention.

In a per curiam opinion, the Court denied the stay applications and all other relief. The majority of the Court concluded that, because he had procedurally defaulted it, Breard could not raise his Vienna Convention claim on federal habeas corpus review. Moreover, the Court reasoned that Breard could not have demonstrated that the alleged violation of the Vienna Convention had an effect on his state trial that ought to have resulted in the overturning of his conviction. Additionally, the Court found that the Vienna Convention did not clearly provide a foreign nation with a private right of action in U.S. courts. Justices John Paul Stevens, Ruth Bader Ginsburg, and Stephen Breyer, in separate dissents, argued that the Court ought to have granted the stay applications and considered the merits of the case to different degrees.

The case is also notable, as a precedent, because it is one of the most recent affirmations at the U.S. Supreme Court level of the continued validity of the long-standing U.S. constitutional law principle that a duly Senate ratified treaty may be overridden by a later domestic statute enacted by mere majorities in each house of Congress.  Most countries do not permit treaties to be amended by domestic laws, and instead hold them to be superior to all legal enactments except the provisions of the national constitution in effect when the treaty was adopted.

Aftermath

Shortly after this decision, Ángel Francisco
Breard was executed by lethal injection administered by the Commonwealth of Virginia on April 14, 1998, aged 32.

See also
 List of United States Supreme Court cases, volume 523
 List of United States Supreme Court cases
 Lists of United States Supreme Court cases by volume
 Sanchez-Llamas v. Oregon (2006)
 Medellin v. Texas (2008)
General:
 Capital punishment in Virginia
 Capital punishment in the United States
 List of people executed in Virginia

References

Further reading

External links
 
REPORTS ARCHIVE FOR THE YEAR 2004
Breard v. Greene: US Supreme Court Decision (17 Apr 98)

United States Supreme Court cases
International Court of Justice cases
Legal history of Virginia
1998 in United States case law
1998 in international relations
United States Supreme Court cases of the Rehnquist Court
United States death penalty case law